Hangvar is a populated area, a socken (not to be confused with parish), on the Swedish island of Gotland. It comprises the same area as the administrative Hangvar District, established on 1January 2016.

Hangvar is the home of football club Hangvar SK.

Geography 
Hangvar is the name of the socken as well as the district. It is also the name of the small village surrounding the medieval Hangvar Church, sometimes referred to as Hangvar kyrkby. It is situated across the northern tip of Gotland. , Hangvar Church belongs to Forsa parish in Norra Gotlands pastorat, along with the churches in Lärbro, Hellvi, Hall and Hallshuk.

Located on the west coast of Hangvar are the Sigsarve beach and fishing site, as well as Ireviken (or Irevik or Ihreviken), a former fishing village now a small holiday resort and community. Along the west coast of Hangvar is the Hall-Hangvar nature reserve. The reserve was established in 1967 and expanded in 1999.

References

External links 

Objects from Hangvar at the Digital Museum by Nordic Museum

Populated places in Gotland County